Gustavo Alberto Castillo García (born November 29, 1994, in Jiquipilco) is a Mexican professional footballer who last played for Halcones de Morelos. He made his professional debut for Toluca during a Copa MX draw against Pumas UNAM on 16 September 2014.

External links
 
 

1994 births
Living people
Association football midfielders
Deportivo Toluca F.C. players
Deportivo Toluca F.C. Premier players
Liga Premier de México players
Footballers from the State of Mexico
Mexican footballers